Renuka Yadav (born 18 July 1994) is an Indian female field hockey player. She has one of the youngest members of the national women's team that qualified for Rio Olympics 2016. She is from Rajnandgaon District of Chhattisgarh, which has also been called "the Hockey Nursery of India." She is the second from Chhattisgarh to qualify for the Olympics, after Leslie Claudius. She is first woman from Chhattisgarh to qualify for Olympics.

References

2. साइकिल पर दूध बेचकर तय किया ओलिंपिक तक का सफ़र : रेणुका यादव

External links

Living people
Field hockey players from Chhattisgarh
Indian female field hockey players
1994 births
Olympic field hockey players of India
Field hockey players at the 2016 Summer Olympics
Sportswomen from Chhattisgarh
21st-century Indian women
21st-century Indian people
South Asian Games gold medalists for India
South Asian Games medalists in field hockey